The Cultural Revolution (1980–1983; : Enqelābe Farhangi) was a period following the Iranian Revolution, when the academia of Iran was purged of Western and non-Islamic influences (including traditionalist unpolitical Islamic doctrines) to align them with the revolutionary and political Islam. The cultural revolution sometimes involved violence in taking over the university campuses, as higher education in Iran had many secularist and leftist forces who were opposed to Ayatollah Khomeini's Islamic state in Iran. The official name used by the Islamic Republic is "Cultural Revolution".

Directed by the Cultural Revolutionary Headquarters and later by the Supreme Cultural Revolution Council, the revolution initially closed universities for three years (1980–1983) and after reopening banned many books and purged thousands of students and lecturers from the schools. The cultural revolution sometimes involved violence in taking over the university campuses. Higher education in Iran had many leftist forces who were opposed to Ayatollah Khomeini's Islamic state in Iran. The resistance of Khomeiniist control at many universities was largely unsuccessful. How many students or faculty were killed is not known.

The government's process of censoring foreign influences has not been without consequences. In addition to interrupting the freedom, education and professional livelihood of many, and striking "a major blow to Iran's cultural and intellectual life and achievement," it contributed to the emigration of many teachers and technocrats. This loss of job skills and capital weakened Iran's economy.

Officials and founders
Some 700 University professors from Iran's academic institutions in a short time.

Islamization of universities
The shutdown of the universities was preceded by attacks on foreign forces on university campuses. On April 18, 1980, after Friday prayers, Khomeini gave a speech harshly attacking the universities.

His remarks are thought to have "served as a signal for an attack that evening on the Tehran Teachers Training College" by his supporters, the Hezbollahi. One student was reportedly lynched, and according to a British correspondent, the campus was left looking like an `a combat zone.` The next day, Hezbollahis ransacked left-wing student offices at Shiraz University. Some 300 students required hospital treatment. Attacks on student groups also took place at Mashad and Isfahan Universities." Attacks continued April 21 and "the next day at the Universities at Ahwaz and Rasht. Over 20 people lost their lives in these university confrontations. ... The universities closed soon after the April confrontation for Islamization`. They were not to open for another two years."

The main theme of the movement was to purify the universities and education system of foreign influences. In his original letter, Khomeini wrote: Set yourselves free from any " –ism" and " –ist" belonging to the East and the West. Be self-dependent and do not expect any help from the foreigners.

After shutting down the universities on 12 June 1980, Khomeini issued a letter, stating:

The "Committee for Islamization of Universities" carried out the task by ensuring an "Islamic atmosphere" for every subject from engineering to the humanities. The headquarters deleted certain courses such as music as "fake knowledge," and committees "came to similar conclusions concerning all subjects in the humanities such as law, political sciences, economy, psychology, education and sociology".

When the institutions reopened, purges continued for five more years with special focus on "Islam’s enemies". Students were screened by committees and those found unfit were not allowed to continue their studies. Students in the University instructor program, for example, "were required to be practicing Muslims, to declare their loyalty to ... the doctrine of the vice regency of the faqih. Non-Muslims were required to refrain from behavior `offensive to Muslims,` and were excluded from all fields of study except accounting and foreign languages."

Outside of the universities, the Cultural Revolution affected some non-academic cultural and scientific figures who it publicly denounced, and the broadcasts of Iranian radio and television, which were now limited to religious and official programs.

Influence
The Cultural Revolution united the theological schools in Qom with state universities and brought secular teachers to Qom for a time. This had the unexpected result of exposing many students in Qom to Western thought so that it is possible to find "Islamic scholars and teachers of theology who know something of contemporary Western thought and philosophy."

Another aspect was that many teachers, engineers, economists, doctors, and technocrats left Iran to escape the Cultural Revolution. While the revolution achieved its goal of ridding the universities of Western influence, it also greatly weakened Iran in the fields of science and technology needed for development.

Institutions of the revolution
The Cultural Revolution Headquarters was established June 12, 1980, and charged by Ayatollah Khomeini with making sure that the cultural policy of the universities was based on Islam, that selected professors were "efficient, committed and vigilant," and dealing with other issues relevant to the Islamic academic revolution.

It was continued by the Supreme Cultural Revolution Council in December 1984. It was described as "the highest body for making policies and decisions in connection with cultural, educational and research activities within the framework of the general policies of the system and considered its approvals indispensable." The body is not stipulated in the Constitution but "was formed under the special circumstances that were prevailing in the early stages of the revolution. The council took its legitimacy from the 9 December 1984 decree of the founder of the Islamic Republic."

This group of seven (in 1980-83) and then 17 (in 1984) that was later expanded to 36 in 1999 was expected to compile and organize all the cultural policies of the country. Hojjatol-Islam Mohammad Khatami was appointed as a member of the High Council for Cultural Revolution in 1996 and became its head in 1997. Mahmoud Ahmadinejad became the head of the Council in 2005, succeeding Khatami; Grand Ayatollah Ali Khamenei has oversight over the Council.

The Council had been active in repressing the student movement of 1983–1989, "banning many books and purging thousands of students and lecturers." The council controls the affairs of the universities and their students by supervising the selection of applicants to the university and by controlling the formation of collegiate institutions.

Since 2001, the Council has frequently called for or demanded either outright state control or governmental filtering of the internet to prevent the dissemination of blasphemy, insults to Iran's Supreme Leader, opposition to the Constitution, the creation of "pessimism and hopelessness among the people regarding the legitimacy and effectiveness of the [Islamic] system", and similar offensive content.

Current work
The Cultural Council continues ensuring that the education and culture of Iran remain "100% Islamic", per Khomeini's mandate. In 2006, there were rumors of universities internally "bracing" for "tighter state control over student bodies and faculties and perhaps even the second ‘Cultural Revolution.'"  This came after Ahmadinejad was elected as Iran's president in 2005 and became the head of the Council. It has resulted in either dismissal or compulsory retirement for veteran university faculty members and their replacement with younger professors more loyal to the Islamic Republic. Many students have been harassed and occasionally incarcerated for writing against or speaking against the government and its policies. The repressive focus on the academy stems from the history of Iranian schools and universities serving as the hotbeds of political opposition, particularly during the beginning of Reza Shah's government.

The Council and its subordinate institutions have been adopting more progressive policies in a departure from certain instances in the past. In the year 1987, there was the creation of the Social and Cultural Council of Women. This agency aggressively defended women's rights and eliminated restrictions that were previously imposed by the High Council of the Cultural Revolution.

Members
The Cultural Council has 41 members, most of whom hold other government posts as well.

Hassan Rouhani
Sadeq Larijani
Ali Larijani
Ali Jannati
Hassan Hashemi
Ahmad Masjid Jamei
Mohammad Farhadi
Ali Asghar Fani
Mahmoud Goudarzi
Sorena Sattari
Mohammad Bagher Nobakht
Shahindokht Molaverdi
Abdulali Ali-Asgari
Mehdi Khamooshi
Mohammad Bagher Khoramshad
Mohammad Mohammadian
Hamid Tayyebi
Kobra Khazali
Hamid Mirzadeh
Nasrollah Pejmanfar
Ali Abbaspoor
Hossein Ali Shahriari

Ahmad Ahmadi
Alireza Arafi
Hamid Parsania
Gholam-Ali Haddad-Adel
Reza Davari Ardakani
Hassan Rahimpour Azghadi
Ali Shariatmadari
Ali Akbar Rashad
Seyed Alireza Sadr Hosseini
Mohammad-Reza Aref
Mohsen Ghomi
Mohammad-Ali Key-Nejad
Mansour Kabganian
Hossein Kachooyan
Mehdi Golshani
Mahmoud Mohammadi Araghi
Mohammad Reza Mokhber Dezfooli
Sadegh Vaez-Zadeh
Ali Akbar Velayati

See also

Cultural Revolution, earlier event in the People's Republic of China
Cultural Revolution (USSR), earlier event in the Soviet Union
Islamic Revolutionary Court deals with "treason against Islam" and other matters.
Islamic conquest of Persia
Farrokhroo Parsa

References and notes

Further reading
A Century of Revolution: Social Movements in Iran 
Iranian Revolution of 1978–79
The Culture of revolution: Revolutionary transformation in Iran

External links
Supreme Cultural Revolution Council
Supreme Council of Cultural Revolution, in a Lecture in Demark: Christian Morality Dissolved in the Acid of Capitalism and Secularism
Supreme Council for Cultural Revolution: We Are Stronger Than America and the West
Ayatollah Khamenei’s responses the president & the chairman of SCCR to the questions posed by experts of public relation department of the SCCR in June 1985.

Aftermath of the Iranian Revolution
History of the Islamic Republic of Iran
Political and cultural purges
1980 in Iran
Islamization
1980s in Islam
Ruhollah Khomeini